The Angolan Athletics Federation (FAA; Federação Angolana de Atletismo) is the governing body for the sport of athletics in Angola.  Current president is Bernardo João.  He was elected in November 2016 for the period 2016-2020.

History 
FAA was founded on February 19, 1979, and was affiliated to the IAAF in the year 1981.

Affiliations 
International Association of Athletics Federations (IAAF)
Confederation of African Athletics (CAA)
Asociación Iberoamericana de Atletismo (AIA; Ibero-American Athletics Association)
Moreover, it is part of the following national organisations:
Angolan Olympic Committee (COA; Portuguese: Comité Olímpico Angolano)

National records 
FAA maintains the national records.

External links 
Official webpage (in Portuguese)

References 

Sports governing bodies in Angola
Angola
National governing bodies for athletics
Sports organizations established in 1979